Mudhalvan is a 1999 Indian Tamil-language political action film produced by R. Madhesh and S. Shankar, written and directed by Shankar. The film stars Arjun, Manisha Koirala and Raghuvaran while Vadivelu and Manivannan appear in supporting roles. The film featured an award-winning soundtrack composed by A. R. Rahman, cinematography by K. V. Anand and dialogues by Sujatha.

The film revolves around an ambitious TV journalist, Pughazhendi, who gets his first interview with the Chief Minister of Tamil Nadu. Pughazh asks harder questions, and the Chief Minister starts trembling and asks him to put his money where his mike is and become his replacement CM for a day. After initially rejecting the offer, Pugazh agrees and does such a great job on his first day, that the actual cabinet collapses and fresh elections are held, where state voters eventually elect him to be their new official Chief Minister. The subsequent unpopularity and jealousy that the old Chief Minister goes through results in him taking revenge on Pugazh, and how he is stopped forms the crux of the story.

The film was released on 7 November 1999, as a Deepavali release. The film enjoyed positive critical acclaim and emerged as one of the top grossing Tamil films of 1999. The film ran for over 100 days in theaters and won awards on a regional scale. The film was later remade in Hindi as Nayak (2001). Also the film was unofficially remade in Bangladeshi Bengali as Minister (2002) and loosely remade in Indian Bengali as MLA Fatakeshto (2006).

Plot
N. Pugazhendi alias Pugazh is a news reporter working for QTV in Chennai. One day, a riot occurs between the students and the bus drivers in the city following a communal clash which disrupts normal life. The Chief Minister of the state, Aranganathar, informs the police over wireless not to arrest the protesters as they belong to his community and political party. The conversation is recorded by Pugazh in his video camera. Pugazh meets Thenmozhi and falls for her honesty and bravery. However, her father does not accept the marriage proposal as he wants to get Thenmozhi married only to a government employee.

One day, QTV arranges for a live interview with Aranganathar and the anchor in charge left his job and joined at another television channel UTV, a rival for QTV. Pugazh is thrilled and excited as he gets the opportunity to interview the CM. During the course of the interview, Pugazh unmasks many events done by Aranganathar and his party against the welfare of the state, for political reasons with necessary evidences, and he also blames Aranganathar for not taking action while at the riot by evidencing his recorded video taken at the time of the riot. Aranganathar justifies his indifferent stands and challenges Pugazh to accept his post for a day so that he will realize the pressures faced on a daily basis. Pugazh, after a brief trepidation, accepts the challenge provided the constitution permits. Lawmakers confirm that such a provision is possible, and Pugazh is sworn in as the CM for 24 hours.

To everyone's surprise, Pugazh does not prefer speaking to the waiting media crew, but he gets into action immediately by collecting a list of irresponsible civil servants and issuing suspension letters immediately. He helps poor people rightfully reclaim houses allotted by the government and requests every Indian citizen to pay all required taxes even if it is for a day, highlighting the effects of avoiding the same. Mayakrishnan, an honest official, is the government secretary and helps Pugazh through his one-day mission. Finally, Pugazh digs a case of corruption against the ruling party leading to the arrest of multiple ex-ministers and even Aranganathar. The same night, Aranganar obtains bail through the attorney general, without even going to Jail. Within minutes of release, he takes Pugazh's success as his defeat and a demean to his long-standing political career, and sends goons to kill Pugazh, who fights off and escapes with minor injuries.

Pugal visits Poonjlai and is applauded by the villagers for his actions in the Agri department. He spends his day with Thenmozhi in peace. Meanwhile, Aranganathar's image is tarnished before the public, and all of his coalition parties refuse to support him to become CM again, resulting in dissolution of the legislature, precipitating a General election. Surveys from multiple media indicate enormous public support for Pugazh to become CM, leading to Aranganathar's anger. He uses his clout to get Pugal's house partly demolished.  Mayakrishnan meanwhile goes to Q TV office to convince Pugazh to come to politics, but Pugazh refuses and states that he is preparing for TNPSC exam. QTV headquarters is then attacked heavily and Pugazh is nearly beaten to death.

The next morning, a huge crowd gathers in front of Pugazh's house, requesting him to contest in the upcoming election. Many political parties also come forward to get his support. However, Pugazh doesn't wish to contest as he wants to lead normal life. Thenmozhi's father meets him and advises him not to go in politics, while accepting his marriage to Thenmozhi, but Mayakrishnan makes Pugazh understand the vast support he has and shows the plight of people and advises him to sacrifice his comfort zone for the sake of achieving heights in the politics and doing good for the people. Finally, Pugazh accepts and contests in the ensuing election. His party wins by the vast majority of votes never seen in the political history of Tamil Nadu, and takes all seats in the Legislature. 

After assuming the office, Pugazh is keen in the state development and gets busy in his schedule of doing welfare to the people, while Aranganathar and other politicians unite and plot to avenge their political failure. They hire a hitman to kill Pugazh, but he escapes the attempt with the help of the Z Cadre security guard officials, who kill the hitman. Pughaz's parents are killed in a bomb blast placed in his house. Enraged on learning Aranganathar is behind the death of his parents, Pugazh challenges the latter that the law will not spare him. Aranganathar plans to create a havoc in the state and has his men plant bombs across Chennai. Pugazh and Mayakrishnan get to know of this by a tactful inquiry of Chinnasamy, who is Aranganathar's right-hand henchman. The bomb squad diffuses all the bombs except one. 

Meanwhile, Aranganathar blames Pugazh to be the man behind the entire episode and claims it as a ploy to win public support. Pugazh realizes that he will be prevented from performing his duties and invites Aranganathar to his office. As their conversation progresses, Pugazh pulls out a gun and shoots himself without causing any major injuries. He throws the gun to Aranganathar who catches it out of his reflexes. At the same time, the security guards officials rush in upon hearing gunfire and see Aranganathar pointing the gun at Pugazh. The security guards shoot and kill Aranganathar. A dying Aranganathar remembers his old interview with Pugazh, that had changed everything. Mayakrishnan blames the deceased Aranganathar for trying to kill the Chief Minister out of political rivalry.

Pugazh feels glad that he can continue his mission without being interrupted, but he also feels guilty for having staged a false incident to kill Aranganathar. He confesses to Mayakrishnan that even he has been forced to play the game of politics. Mayakrishnan supports him by consoling that he played the politics only for a good cause and that Aranganathar deserves this. Thenmozhi's father realizes the greatness of Pugazhendhi and consents to the marriage. Due to administration by Pugazh, the city has become a highly developed state with world class infrastructures and free of violence.

Cast

 Arjun as TV journalist/Chief Minister Pugazhenthi
 Manisha Koirala as Thenmozhi (Voice over by Durga)
 Raghuvaran as Chief Minister Aranganathar
 Laila as Kalakkal Shuba, Pugazhenthi's former boss and colleague news reporter (Voice over by Savitha Reddy)
 Manivannan as Chief Secretary Maya Krishnan
 Vadivelu as Palavesham
 Artist Natanam as R. Narayanan, Pugazhenthi's father
 Kalairani as Pugazhenthi's mother
 Vijayakumar as Thenmozhi's father
 Cochin Haneefa as Chinnasamy, Aranganathar's right-hand henchman
 Fathima Babu as Maragadham, Aranganathar's wife
 S. V. Ramadoss as Minister Thirupathisamy, coalition party leader
 Besant Ravi as slum rogue Alei
 Scissor Manohar as a bus driver in the student riot
 Surya as Manohar, Chief of Security for Pugazhenthi
 Sampath Ram as Sub-Inspector
 Robo Chandru
 Kanal Kannan as auto driver (cameo appearance)
 Omakuchi Narasimhan as Palavesham's uncle (cameo appearance) 
 Ahmed Khan as a dancer in Shakalaka Baby song
 Sushmita Sen in item number "Shakalaka Baby"

Production

Development 
Following the success of Jeans (1998), S. Shankar chose to make a political action film, which would later become Mudhalvan.

Casting 
The lead role was initially written with Rajinikanth in mind, but he was unwilling to star in the film. Vijay was also considered by Shankar for the role, though the actor turned the offer down. Shankar revealed that he even approached Kamal Haasan for the film, but he was doing Hey Ram at that time. Arjun, who had previously collaborated with Shankar in Gentleman (1993), was willing to offer bulk schedule dates for the film and was subsequently signed on.

Shankar noted that he was interested in casting Meena in the leading role, but he opted against doing so as the actress was working with Arjun in another film in the same period, Rhythm (2000). Subsequently, Manisha Koirala, who worked with Shankar in Indian, was selected to play Arjun's heroine. Raghuvaran was signed to play the chief antagonist in the film, while Vadivelu and Manivannan were also chosen to play other characters. Despite reports that Shilpa Shetty was added to the cast in February 1999, it was later clarified to be untrue. Laila, who had made her acting debut earlier in the year with Kallazhagar, was signed on to portray the role planned with Shetty instead. Originally, her role was supposed to feature throughout the film, but Shankar shortened her character, owing to her call sheet problems. Renowned muralist Natanam and Kalairani were cast as Arjun's parents. S. Sashikanth, who went on to produce films like Thamizh Padam (2010) and Kaaviya Thalaivan (2014), and K. R. Mathivaanan, who directed Aridhu Aridhu (2010), worked as assistant directors.

Filming 
The film was jointly launched by S. Shankar and his co-director R. Madhesh in October 1998 at an event attended by actors and technicians from the Tamil film industry, with actors Rajinikanth and Kamal Haasan being the special invitees. Production continued for several months, with reports suggesting that the film was delayed due to Manisha Koirala's unavailability though Shankar later stressed the production work demanded such delay. Parts of the film were also shot in Bikaner, Rajasthan while the team also shot extensively in rural Tamil Nadu. The film's cinematographer Anand later noted that the scenes involving crowds shot on Anna Salai, Chennai were among the hardest and most satisfying scenes he had worked on. The song "Shakalaka Baby" was the last song to be shot, with Sushmita Sen selected to feature in a special appearance for the song. Stunt master Peter Hein revealed that he worked as a body double for Arjun in the scene where he had to run nude on the streets.

Themes and influences

The film dealt with the theme of a television cameraman who is forced to take over the duty of Chief Minister for one day. It also dealt with the concept of opportunities for educated people in politics and demonstrated it is possible to bring change in the country. The film's basic idea was inspired from Nixon-Frost interviews which were broadcast in 1977 and also inspired by Indian actor Sivaji Ganesan being named the honorary mayor of Niagara Falls, New York for one day during his visit to the United States.

Soundtrack

The soundtrack features six songs composed by A. R. Rahman and lyrics penned by Vairamuthu. The song "Shakalaka Baby" was re-edited by A. R. Rahman and featured on the international musical production Bombay Dreams, which ran in Europe and North America from 2002 to 2005. This version was also released as a single. A Mandarin Chinese remix of the track sung by Singaporean singer Kelly Poon was featured in her album In the Heart Of The World (2007).

The release of the soundtrack was held at Sathyam Cinemas, Chennai, on 31 October 1999 with two songs from the film being performed on stage. The special guests for the event were actor Kamal Haasan and actress Sushmita Sen, who performed an item number in the film. The event was well attended by the cast and the crew of the film, with other guests including cinematographer P. C. Sriram, actress Sarika, and actor Suriya.

The soundtrack was a success, and the initial day audio sale alone was more than three lakh units. The song "Azhagana Rakshasiye" is based on Rithigowla Raga.

Release
The film was released on 7 November 1999 while the Telugu dubbed version, Oke Okkadu released on 9 November 1999 which was also a commercial success. Upon release, the film won positive reviews and was successful at the box office. It was later remade in Hindi as Nayak starring Anil Kapoor. The film went on to run for over one hundred days in cinemas with an event being held at Kamaraj Hall on 25 February 2000 to mark one hundred days since release. The event, similar to the launch, attracted several people from the film industry with Kamal Haasan, once again, being the chief guest of the event.

Reception 
On 21 November 1999, Ananda Vikatan in its review gave 43 marks and appreciated the film stating that: "One can see Shankar's grandeur in the way he presented a social problem magnificently. Shankar has approached a serious social issue with usual entertainment elements". The Hindu said "Shankar scores again". In regard to the lead performances, Arjun is described as having "acquitted himself with aplomb", while Manisha's performance was criticized with claims that she "lacks the freshness that one always associates her with". The critic also referred to Shankar's direction and Sujatha's dialogs as a "positive", while drawing praise to the videos of the songs describing that "every song and dance sequence seems a magnum opus by itself". The New Indian Express described the film as "absorbing" and praised certain scenes, although it criticized the videos of the songs as a "fiasco".

Awards

Filmfare Best Music Director Award - A. R. Rahman
Filmfare Award for Best Female Playback Singer – Tamil - Vasundhara Das for "Shakalaka Baby"
Filmfare Award for Best Dance Choreographer - South - Chinni Prakash
Tamil Nadu State Film Award for Best Actor - Arjun Sarja
Tamil Nadu State Film Award for Best Villain - Raghuvaran
Tamil Nadu State Film Award for Best Music Director - A. R. Rahman
 Nominated - Tamil Nadu State Film Award for Best Comedian - Vadivelu
 Nominated - Filmfare Award for Best Actor - Arjun Sarja

Legacy

The scene where a crowd gathers around the protagonist's house to persuade him to contest elections was included by Behindwoods.com in their list of "Top 20 Mass Scenes".

Popular culture
Songs from the film's soundtrack inspired a number of Tamil film titles. Rama Narayanan directed a film titled Shakalaka Baby in 2002, while Radha Mohan made Uppu Karuvaadu in 2015. A film titled Lukku Vida Thonalaiyaa, a line from the song "Shakalaka Baby", also began production in 2002 but was not released.

The scenes, songs and dialogues from the film has been parodied in Budget Padmanabhan (2000), Kandha Kadamba Kathir Vela (2000), Kanna Unnai Thedukiren (2001), Run (2002), Dubai Seenu (2007), Sivaji (2007), Singakutty (2008), and Kaalaippani (2008). The film has also been spoofed in Star Vijay's Lollu Sabha with the same title with Santhanam as the main character. In 2017 film Kavan, the interview scene was inspired from this film.

See also
 Servant of the People (TV series) (2015–2019), Ukrainian comedy television series with similar concept, starring Volodymyr Zelenskyy.

References

External links

Bibliography

1999 films
Indian political drama films
Indian action drama films
Indian political thriller films
Political action films
Films about corruption in India
Journalism adapted into films
Films about journalists
Tamil films remade in other languages
1990s Tamil-language films
Films scored by A. R. Rahman
Films directed by S. Shankar
Films shot in Rajasthan
Films about elections
Fictional portrayals of the Tamil Nadu Police
1990s action drama films
1990s political thriller films